In Christian theology, kenosis is the 'self-emptying' of Jesus.  The word  is used in the Epistle to the Philippians (abbreviated "Philippians"): " made himself nothing" (NIV), or "[he] emptied himself" (NRSV) (Philippians 2:7), using the verb form , meaning "to empty".

The exact meaning varies among theologians.  The less controversial meaning is that he emptied his own desires and becoming entirely receptive to God's divine will, "obedient to the point of death— even death on a cross."  Philippians encourages other Christians to be similarly willing to submit to divine will, even if it comes at great personal cost.  The phrase is also used to explain the human side of Jesus: that Jesus, to truly live as a mortal, had to have voluntarily bound use of his divine powers in some way, emptying himself.  Philippians says that "though [Jesus] was in the form of God, [he] did not regard equality with God as something to be exploited," suggesting that Jesus was not "abusing" his divine status to avoid the implications of a mortal life.  This interpretation is contested by others, who consider this to overly downplay the divine power of Jesus.

Etymology and definition
The term kenosis comes from the Greek , meaning "to empty out". The Liddell–Scott Greek–English Lexicon gives the following definition simplified for the noun:
 emptying, depletion, emptiness (of life) (Vettius Valens)
 waning (of the moon) (Epicurus)

New Testament usage
The New Testament does not use the noun form , but the verb form  occurs five times (Romans 4:14, 1 Corinthians 1:17, 9:15, 2 Corinthians 9:3, Philippians 2:7) and the future form  once.  Of these five times, Philippians 2:7 is generally considered the most significant for the Christian idea of kenosis:

John the Baptist displayed the attitude when he said of Jesus: "He must become greater; I must become less." (John 3:30).

Christology

Kenotic Christology
Philippians 2 is sometimes used to explain the human side of Jesus's existence.  In early Christianity, some groups propounded beliefs of a fully human Jesus who was especially honored and raised up by God (adoptionism), while other groups argued for a fully divine Jesus that was more like a spiritual apparition (docetism).  The Chalcedonian doctrine that prevailed was that Jesus had a dual nature, and was both fully human and fully God.  Kenotic Christology essentially states that in order to truly live a human experience, Jesus, despite being a preexisting divine being, voluntarily humbled himself.  He could still perform miracles, heal the sick, and dispense reliable moral doctrine, but was not using divine might to resolve all of his problems as a mortal, and struggled through all the usual human problems.  Thus, Jesus needed to sleep and eat; was tempted by the Devil in the wilderness; could become frustrated at fig trees not being in season; stated that no one knows the day or hour of the end of the world; and so on.

Gottfried Thomasius is the first theologian to discuss and expound upon kenotic Christology by name.  Other theologians associated with kenotic Christology include P. T. Forsyth, H. R. Mackintosh, Charles Gore, Fisher Humphreys, Donald G. Dawe, and Roger E. Olson.

Eastern Orthodoxy
Orthodox theology emphasises following the example of Christ. Kenosis is only possible through humility and presupposes that one seeks union with God. The Poustinia tradition of the Russian Orthodox Church is one major expression of this search.

Kenosis is not only a Christological issue in Orthodox theology, but also relates to Pneumatology, matters of the Holy Spirit. Kenosis, relative to the human nature, denotes the continual epiklesis and self-denial of one's own human will and desire. With regard to Christ, there is a kenosis of the Son of God, a condescension and self-sacrifice for the redemption and salvation of all humanity. Humanity can also participate in God's saving work through theosis; becoming holy by grace.

In Eastern Orthodoxy, kenosis does not concern becoming like God in essence or being, which is pantheism; instead, it concerns becoming united to God by grace, through his "Energies". Orthodox theology distinguishes between divine Essence and Energies. Kenosis therefore is a paradox and a mystery since "emptying oneself" in fact fills the person with divine grace and results in union with God. Kenosis in Orthodox theology is the transcending or detaching of oneself from the world or the passions, it is a component of dispassionation. Much of the earliest debates between the Arian and Orthodox Christians were over kenosis. The need for clarification about the human and divine nature of the Christ (see the hypostatic union) were fought over the meaning and example that Christ set, as an example of kenosis or ekkenosis.

Catholicism
Pope Pius XII, in his 1951 , condemned a particular interpretation of Philippians in regards to the kenosis:

In John of the Cross's thinking, kenosis is the concept of the 'self-emptying' of one's own will and becoming entirely receptive to God and the divine will. It is used both as an explanation of the Incarnation, and an indication of the nature of God's activity and will. Mystical theologian John of the Cross' work "Dark Night of the Soul" is a particularly lucid explanation of God's process of transforming the believer into the icon or "likeness of Christ".

Unitarianism
Since some forms of Unitarianism do not accept the personal pre-existence of Christ, their interpretations of Philippians 2:7, and the concept of kenosis—Christ "emptying" himself—take as a starting point that his "emptying" occurred in life, and not before birth. However, as Thomas Belsham put it, there are varying views on when in life this emptying occurred. Belsham took this to be at the crucifixion, whereas Joseph Priestley took this to be in the Garden of Gethsemane when Christ did not resist arrest. The Christadelphian Tom Barling considered that the "emptying" of Christ was a continual process which started in the earliest references to Christ's character, Luke 2:40,52, and continued through the temptations of Christ and his ministry.

Gnosticism
The equivalent to kenosis in Gnostic literature is Christ's withdrawal of his own luminosity into himself, so as to cease dazzling his own disciples. In the Pistis Sophia, at the request of his disciples, "Jesus drew to himself the glory of his light".

Kenotic ethic
The kenotic ethic is an interpretation of Philippians 2:7 that takes the passage, where Jesus is described as having "emptied himself", as not primarily as Paul putting forth a theory about God in this passage, but as using God's humility exhibited in the incarnation as a call for Christians to be similarly subservient to others.

See also
Communicatio idiomatum
Ego death
Martyrdom
Surrender (religion)

Notes

References

External links

George Ellis interview - from NPR
Kenosis - Christ "Emptied Himself" - essays from Dan Musick.

Christology
New Testament Greek words and phrases
Eastern Orthodox theology
Carmelite spirituality
Christian terminology
Nondualism
Nature of Jesus Christ